Mahmood Fahmi is a Swedish parliamentary politician and member of the Moderate Party.

References 

1965 births
Living people
Members of the Riksdag from the Moderate Party
Swedish people of Kurdish descent